The 2013–14 A.C. ChievoVerona season was the club's sixth consecutive season in Serie A.

Players

Out on loan

Serie A

League table

Matches

Statistics

Appearances and goals

Top scorers

Sources

Chievo
A.C. ChievoVerona seasons